The Kokomo Metropolitan Statistical Area, as defined by the United States Census Bureau, is an area consisting of Howard county in Indiana, anchored by the city of Kokomo. As of the 2000 census, the MSA had a population of 101,541 (though a July 1, 2009 estimate placed the population at 98,787). The official 2013 population estimate for the metro area is 82,760 people are in the Kokomo metropolitan area. The MSA formerly included Tipton County, Indiana. Kokomo is also the principal city of the area known as North Central Indiana, the area around Kokomo with economic ties.  The six county area including Cass, Clinton, Fulton, Howard, Miami, and Tipton counties had population of 228,331 people in 2010.

Counties
Howard
Tipton (no longer included)

Communities

Incorporated places
Cities
Elwood (partial)
Kokomo (Principal city)
Tipton (no longer included)
Towns
Greentown
Kempton 
Russiaville
Sharpsville 
Windfall

Census-designated places
Note: All census-designated places are unincorporated.
Indian Heights (annexed to city of Kokomo in 2012)

Unincorporated places

Townships

Howard County

Tipton County
Cicero
Jefferson
Liberty
Madison
Prairie
Wildcat

Demographics
As of the census of 2000, there were 101,541 people, 41,269 households, and 28,307 families residing within the MSA. The racial makeup of the MSA was 91.13% White, 5.50% African American, 0.33% Native American, 0.90% Asian, 0.02% Pacific Islander, 0.76% from other races, and 1.36% from two or more races. Hispanic or Latino of any race were 1.88% of the population.

The median income for a household in the MSA was $46,017, and the median income for a family was $54,566. Males had a median income of $42,938 versus $25,814 for females. The per capita income for the MSA was $21,988.

Combined Statistical Area

The Kokomo–Peru Combined Statistical Area (CSA) is made up of three counties in Indiana. The statistical area includes one metropolitan area and one micropolitan area. As of the 2000 Census, the CSA had a population of 137,623 (though a July 1, 2009 estimate placed the population at 134,788). A 2013 population estimate placed the combined statistical area at 118,900 however, which again, further leads to the idea that the Kokomo Metropolitan area now only includes Howard County.

Components
Metropolitan Statistical Areas (MSAs)
Kokomo (Howard and Tipton counties)
Micropolitan Statistical Areas (μSA)
Peru (Miami County)

See also
Indiana census statistical areas

References

 
Howard County, Indiana
Tipton County, Indiana